This is a list of gay male teen fiction books.

Books

Series

See also

LGBT literature
Young adult fiction

References

List of gay young adult novels

 
 
Male homosexuality

LGBT-related lists
Lists of novels